The Excalibur Estate was a post-war 1940s housing estate of 189 prefabricated houses in Catford, South London. The estate contained the last sizeable collection of post-war prefabricated houses in the United Kingdom. 
In 2011, Lewisham Council approved a plan to replace the prefabs with 371 houses, with demolition scheduled to begin in 2013. English Heritage has granted listed building status to six of the "prefab" houses. The proposed demolition led to campaigns by residents, English Heritage and the Twentieth Century Society to save the properties, with an unsuccessful legal challenge to prevent redevelopment, and a return to parkland, if they were demolished. Apart from the six with Grade II listing, all the buildings are due for demolition by early 2023, with the redeveloped estate planned for completion by the end of 2023.

Background

Following the London Blitz of the Second World War, London was facing a severe housing shortage. To quickly alleviate this problem, London, like many other British cities set about building temporary prefabricated houses.

Fifteen hundred homes in Lewisham were destroyed in the first year of the war alone. The level of destruction across many British cities brought about the passing of the Housing (Temporary Accommodation) Act 1944, which led to the building of Excalibur and many estates like it.

The Excalibur Estate was constructed as one of these projects on parkland in Catford between 1945 and 1946 by German and Italian prisoners of war. The estate consisted of single-story prefabricated bungalows designed by the Ministry of Works; each with two bedrooms, a private garden and an indoor lavatory.

Despite only being intended to stand for ten years, many prefabricated estates survived much longer. Many corporations replaced such estates with conventional-build or permanent prefabricated council houses throughout the 1950s, 60s and early 1970s. Unusually Excalibur survived to the 2010s.

Etymology
The estate is so called because the streets are named after characters from Arthurian legend. The precise reason for these street names is unknown.

The estate

The estate consisted of 189 single storey, two-bedroomed prefabricated bungalows constructed by the Uni-seco company. The nearly flat roofs have a 7 degree pitch. There were no amenities situated on the estate except for the church, St. Marks. This building was originally two huts, it was constructed on site in the conventional manner with a sheet-metal barrelled roof, similar to an Anderson shelter.

The nearest railway station to the estate is Bellingham.

Demolition proposals
The London Borough of Lewisham proposed to demolish and replace all of the properties on the  site from 2013, using the developer L&Q. As they were the last large inhabited collection of prefabricated houses of this era, this decision proved controversial.

Conservation battle
Conservationists fought to save the estate from demolition, which they claimed was a unique surviving example of twentieth-century architecture. They succeeded in seeing Grade II listing applied by English Heritage to six buildings on the estate including St. Mark's Church, exempting them from demolition. The conservation of the estate has been spearheaded by the Twentieth Century Society; which claimed that the overall layout and planning of the estate was key to its uniqueness and that just keeping six buildings and surrounding them with new houses did not suffice. Despite the Twentieth Century Society campaigning for the entire estate to be made a conservation area and English Heritage recommending 21 buildings be listed, the Department for Digital, Culture, Media and Sport would only go so far as to list six of the buildings. Under listing guidelines for twentieth-century buildings, only buildings with few moderations should be listed; in the case of Excalibur, most buildings had modified windows and doors. A prominent local resident favouring conservation stated: "The Excalibur Prefab Estate is the largest of its kind now left in Europe. Europe values its war time history, we on the estate think it’s time we did too." Emily Gee of English Heritage said of the estate: "The historical resonance of the estate is considerable. The design of the buildings, with their subtle modern influences, and the community-focused planning of the estate testifies to the thoughtfulness of post-Blitz reconstruction."

Case for demolition
Lewisham Council rebutted claims that the houses had historical significance and maintained that it would be "virtually impossible to bring them up to modern standards, a view shared by a number of residents, who were mainly council tenants." The council repeatedly argued that residents favour redevelopment; citing a poll amongst residents in which 56 percent voted in favour of redevelopment. Conservationists have argued this result was inevitable as residents felt there was very little prospect of the council spending any money on their homes, leaving them in outdated accommodation. Of the estate Lewisham Council stated "We have a responsibility under the national Decent Homes programme to bring all its housing up to a recognised standard. It simply is not financially viable to refurbish the estate." Of the listing, Lewisham mayor Steve Bullock said. "The listing by English Heritage was perverse and it has made me extremely concerned about the way that organisation behaves… These are temporary prefabricated buildings, not architectural gems"

Parkland covenant

Campaigners argued that the proposal to build new homes on the site could be subject to legal challenge. Prior to the building of the prefabs, the land was parkland. The land was donated by the then Governor-General of Australia, Lord Forster to the then London County Council as parkland. In a 1946 letter, the London County Council promised to return it to parkland once the temporary houses had been cleared. When Lewisham council took over the estate in 1965, this letter was then made void, as Lewisham council never agreed to uphold the content of this letter. Nor had Excalibur Estate been designated a temporary housing estate. Uni-Seco, the prefab manufacturers and builders, never claimed their homes had a limited life span of only 10 years.

Parts of the original Forster Memorial Park are still in existence to the west of Excalibur. Other housing however separates Excalibur from the remaining parts of the park, so if returning the estate to parkland were to become a reality, Forster Memorial Park would be divided into two parts by Longhill Road and Battersby Road.

Redevelopment
In April 2011, Lewisham Council approved a plan to replace the prefabs with 371 homes. Only some of the new homes would be for social housing. The project was originally set for completion by 2018, but after delays, all the buildings – apart from the six with Grade II listing – are now due for demolition in 2023. The redeveloped estate is due for completion by the end of 2023.

See also 
Forster Memorial Park

References

External links 

 Catford from the OpenStreetMap
 Jim Blackender Excalibur Prefab Estate Catford
 Dan Kitwood An audio account of a resident
 Guardian, 28 December 2012 Residents' accounts
 Simon Jenkins, Guardian, 6 January 2011 Excalibur's castles built from postwar dreams must not be demolished
 Flickr Flickr image gallery
 L&Q, Redevelopment proposals
 Riba Journal Excalibur's End

Catford
Districts of the London Borough of Lewisham
Housing estates in London